Baoqing may refer to:

 Baoqing Prefecture, former name of Shaoyang, Hunan, China
 Baoqing era (1225–1227), an era name of Emperor Lizong of Song, after which the prefecture was named
 Baoqing County, Heilongjiang, China
 Baoqing Town, the seat of Baoqing County